Æthelred or Ethelred is an Old English personal name (a compound of æþele and ræd, meaning "noble counsel" or "well-advised") and may refer to:

Anglo-Saxon England
 Æthelred and Æthelberht, legendary princes of Kent
 Æthelred of Mercia (fl. 645–709), King of Mercia 
 Æthelred I (disambiguation), several kings
 Æthelred II of Northumbria, King of Northumbria (fl. 854–862)
 Æthelred II of East Anglia (fl. 870s)
 Æthelred Mucel (fl. 840–895), father of King Alfred the Great's wife, Ealhswith
 Æthelred (archbishop) (fl. 870–888), Archbishop of Canterbury
 Æthelred, Lord of the Mercians (fl. 881–911)
 Æthelred of Cornwall (fl. 1001), Bishop of Cornwall
 Æthelred the Unready (978–1016), King of England

Post-Conquest
 Ethelred of Scotland (fl. 1093), son of Malcolm III and Saint Margaret
 Aelred of Rievaulx (1110–1167), English writer, saint and abbot of Rievaulx
 Ethelred Taunton (1857–1907), English Roman Catholic priest and historical writer
 Aethelred Eldridge (1930-2018), American academic and painter

See also
 Ethelreda (given name)

Old English given names
Old English masculine given names